Humboldt River Ranch is a census-designated place (CDP) in Pershing County, Nevada, United States. As of the 2010 census the population was 119.

Geography
The community is served by Exit 129 on I-80. Nevada State Route 401 leads west  to Rye Patch State Recreation Area, located at Rye Patch Dam on the Humboldt River.

Demographics

References

Census-designated places in Pershing County, Nevada
Census-designated places in Nevada